Grevillea hodgei, commonly known as the Coochin Hills grevillea, is a species of flowering plant in the family Proteaceae and is endemic to a restricted area of Queensland. It is an erect shrub with deeply divided leaves with erect, linear leaflets, and clusters of hairy, cream-coloured flowers.

Description

Taxonomy
Grevillea hodgei was first formally described in 1994 by Peter M. Olde and Neil R. Marriott in The Grevillea Book from specimens Marriott collected near the Coochin Hills in the Glasshouse Mountains near Beerwah in 1992.  The specific epithet (hodgei) honours Mervyn William Hodge.

Distribution and habitat
This grevillea grows on rocky ledges in a few isolated places near Beerwah.

Conservation status
Grevillea hodgei is listed as "critically endangered" under the Australian Government Environment Protection and Biodiversity Conservation Act 1999 and the Queensland Government Nature Conservation Act 1992. The main threats to the species are land clearing, increasing urbanisation and inappropriate fire regimes.

See also
 List of Grevillea species

References

hodgei
Proteales of Australia
Flora of Queensland
Plants described in 1994